Everybody's Talking: The Houston Tapes, Volume 1 is a live album by the American folk music group the Kingston Trio, released in 1989 (see 1989 in music). The group consisted of Bob Shane, George Grove and Nick Reynolds. Reynolds had left the group in 1967 and returned in 1988.

Reception

The Allmusic critic Zac Johnson was critical of the album, writing that the live performance "seems clumsy and a little disturbing... and the various jokes about gays and masturbation seem awfully creepy from these guys... and while their humor on their original LPs seems bright and original, in 1989 their onstage banter seems forced, a little mean-spirited, and rarely funny. Unlike seasoned artists like Johnny Cash and Willie Nelson, whose journeys through life and show business have added some wisdom and depth to their performances, the Kingston Trio's travels seem to have made them seem more like Vegas comedians performing way off the strip."

Track listing
 "Hard Ain't it Hard'" (Woody Guthrie) – 3:51
 "Talk" – 1:29
 "Three Jolly Coachmen" (Traditional) – 2:18
 "Early Morning Rain" (Gordon Lightfoot) – 3:30
 "Talk" – 1:43
 "Greenback Dollar" (Hoyt Axton, Kennard Ramsey) – 3:01
 "Talk" – 1:50
 "Everybody's Talkin'" (Fred Neil) – 3:06
 "Talk" – :35
 "Ah Woe, Ah Me" (Reynolds, Shane, Stewart) – 2:50
 "Talk" – :30
"M.T.A." (Bess Lomax Hawes, Jacqueline Steiner) - 3:16
 "Band Introductions" – 5:15
 "Everything" (A. Elliott) – 3:33
 "Talk" – 2:29
 "Long Black Veil" (Danny Dill, Marijohn Wilkin) - 3:46
 "Talk" – :57
 "Hobo's Lullaby" (Goebel Reeves) – 3:34
"Tom Dooley" (Alan Lomax, Frank Warner) – 3:05
 "Talk" – 1:05
"A Worried Man" (Dave Guard, Tom Glazer) – 3:08
 "Talk" – 48
"Scotch and Soda" (Dave Guard) – 2:21
 "Talk" – :46
 "I'm Going Home" (Fred Geis) – 3:08

Personnel
Performers
Bob Shane – vocals, guitar
Nick Reynolds – vocals, tenor guitar, conga
George Grove – vocals, banjo, guitar
Paul Gabrielson – bass guitar
Tom Green – percussion
Ben Schubert – fiddle, electric tenor guitar
Frank Sanchez – congas, bongos

Production
George Grove – producer
Ron Busch – executive producer
Phil Barratt – engineer

References

The Kingston Trio albums
1989 live albums